Edward Charles Schmults (born February 6, 1931) is an American lawyer who served as the Deputy Attorney General of the United States from 1981 to 1984. He attended Yale University and Harvard Law School.

References

1931 births
Living people
Harvard Law School alumni
Politicians from Paterson, New Jersey
American lawyers
Yale University alumni
United States Deputy Attorneys General